Niklas Westberg (born 1 April 1979) is a former Swedish footballer who played as a goalkeeper.

References

External links

Fotbolltransfers profile

1979 births
Living people
Association football goalkeepers
AIK Fotboll players
IK Sirius Fotboll players
IF Brommapojkarna players
IFK Norrköping players
AFC Eskilstuna players
Swedish footballers
Allsvenskan players
Superettan players